is a Japanese rock band, formed in March 2004 in Yokohama. It consists of vocalist and rhythm guitarist Takuro Sugawara, guitarist and backing vocalist Yoshimitsu Taki, bassist Kazuhiko Nakamura, and drummer Chihiro Kamijo, who came up with the band's name. Piano pieces included in some songs are performed by Taki, while the characteristic shouts are provided by Nakamura.

History

2005–2009: Early releases and major label debut
The band signed to under_bar, a sub-label of Reverb Records, and released two early mini-albums, Gjallarhorn in 2005 and Phantomime in 2006, and played live shows in Yokohama and Tokyo.

2007 saw the band signed to EMI Music Japan and the releases of The World e.p. which featured newly recorded version of songs from Gjallarhorn and two new tracks, and the Discommunication e.p., which features the song "Discommunication" and a 35-minute live recording. At the end of 2007 they released their first full album, Termination, after which they began their first solo tour.

In the summer of 2008 the band released the double A-side single "Supernova/Wanderland", which also included piano instrumentals of both songs and a third song called "Wildpitch". 9mm Parabellum Bullet were invited to play at Asian Kung-Fu Generation's Nano-Mugen Festival that year at the Yokohama Arena, a festival notable for featuring up-and-coming acts alongside more well known and foreign acts. They covered "Motorbreath" for the October 2008 Metallica tribute album Metal-ikka.

In October the band released their second full album Vampire and proceeded onto the Vampire Empire Tour 08/09. In April 2009, the band released their first live DVD, Act I, which contains 4 concerts from different points in their career.

2009–2011: Revolutionary and Movement
In late spring of 2009, the band released the mini-album Black Market Blues e.p., which also included a recording of their free live performance at Yoyogi Park as a B-side. 2009 also saw 9mm Parabellum Bullet's first nomination at the MTV Video Music Awards Japan for "Best Rock Video", where they were nominated for the video of their song "Living Dying Message". They also performed this song live at the show.

9mm Parabellum Bullet appeared at numerous rock festivals across Japan notably including Rock in Japan Festival, Rising Sun Rock Festival and Space Shower's Sweet Love Shower. On September 9, 2009, 9mm Parabellum Bullet had their first show at the Nippon Budokan titled 999. This performance would appear on the Cold Edge e.p., released on September 30.

9mm Parabellum Bullet were invited to play at Countdown Japan 09/10. In early-January they released the single "Inochi no Zenmai", which was used as the theme for the live-action adaptation of the Higanjima manga. The single includes a cover of Linda Yamamoto's 1972 song "Dou ni mo Tomaranai". It was announced that April 21, 2010, would be the date of 9mm Parabellum Bullet's third full album release, titled Revolutionary. It was followed by a tour across Japan. In late March, a music video was shot for the last track of the new album, called "The Revolutionary".

On May 18, 2011, the single "Atarashii Hikari" was released. The band's fourth album Movement was released on June 15. They also performed at Yokohama Arena on June 26.

2012–present: Dawning and Waltz on Life Line
9mm Parabellum Bullet covered "Territorial Pissings" for the album Nevermind Tribute, which was released on April 4, 2012 and is composed of various Japanese bands covering the entirety of Nirvana's highly acclaimed album Nevermind. Their first acoustic performance for MTV Unplugged was held at Billboard Live Tokyo with a limited capacity of 150 fans and released on home video on May 27. Their fourth single "Heart ni Hi wo Tsukete" followed on October 24, 2012.

On April 1, 2013, EMI Music Japan was completely merged into Universal Music Japan as a sublabel by the name EMI Records Japan as a result of Universal Music's purchase of EMI in September 2012. All the artists from EMI Music Japan will continue releasing material at Universal Music Japan while still maintaining the catalogue code (TOCT). Their fifth single "Answer and Answer" was released on May 29. 9mm Parabellum Bullet released their fifth album Dawning on June 26, 2013.

They performed a cover of "Instant Music" for the February 2014 The Pillows tribute album, Rock and Sympathy.

The band took part in the first day of Luna Sea's Lunatic Fest at Makuhari Messe on June 27, 2015. Luna Sea bassist J joined them onstage for "Cold Edge". 9mm Parabellum Bullet released a quadruple A-side single, "Hangyaku no March/Dark Horse/Daremo Shiranai/Mad Pierrot", on September 9. They also contributed a cover to a November 2015 tribute album for The Telephones, We are Disco!!! ~Tribute to The Telephones~.

In January 2016, 9mm Parabellum Bullet announced they had switched to the independent record label Sazanga Records. The album Waltz on Life Line was released on April 27, 2016. The band provided the opening theme songs "Inferno" and "Sacrifice" for the Berserk anime adaptation.

Band members
 – vocals, rhythm guitar
 – lead guitar, piano, backing vocals
 – bass, screams
 – drums

Equipment

Sugawara
Guitars - ESP
ESP Snapper-S/AL (Black, Vintage White)
Gibson Les Paul Special
Edwards Jr. Custom
Navigator N-LP-480CTM
Navigator N-LP-480LTD
ESP TYG (Takuro Sugawara Signature Model)
ESP Bricoleur (Takuro Sugawara Signature Model)
ESP Truckster (James Hetfield Signature Model)
Amps - Marshall, Fender
Fender Twin Reverb
Marshall JCM2000
Marshall Vintage Modern 2466 Amp Head
Marshall 1960AV
Marshall JCM800 2203
Marshall 1960X

Taki
Guitars - ESP
ESP Snapper-S/AS (Honey Blond, Burner)
ESP Snapper-S/AS Matte Black (SUFFER Protomodel)
ESP Potbelly-STD (Amber Cherry Sunburst)
ESP Suffer (Yoshimitsu Taki Signature Model)
ESP Suffer Proto Type
ESP Max Cavalera AX (Max Cavalera Signature Model)
Edwards Karmaster
Amps - Mesa/Boogie
Mesa/Boogie Dual Rectifier
Mesa/Boogie Triple Rectifier
Mesa/Boogie F-100
Yamaha F50-112

Nakamura
Guitars - ESP
ESP AP 220 (Black)
ESP AP Custom Mat Black (Untitled Protomodel)
ESP Untitled (Kazuhiko Nakamura Signature Model)
ESP PB Type Custom
ESP Amaze-CTM (See Thru Black)
ESP X-JB (Acrylic Body)
Sepia Crue EAB-430 Acoustic Bass
Landscape SWB-Artist Electric Upright Bass
Amps - SWR
SWR 750x

Kamijo
Kamijo is a full endorser of Yamaha drums, Remo drumheads, and Zildjian cymbals and drumsticks. Kamijo was a former user of Ludwig drums (notably the Vistalite series) prior to his switch to Yamaha, and has his signature model of drumsticks on Zildjian's website.Drums - Yamaha Birch Custom Absolute, Blue Ice Sparkle
 8"x10" Tom
 8"x12" Tom
 13"x14" Floor Tom
 15"x16" Floor Tom
 22"x18" Bass Drum (x2)
 6"x14" Snare Drum (as side snare)
 6.5"x14" Copper SnareCymbals - Zildjian
 14" A Custom Hi-Hats
 6" Zil-Bel Small
 8" A Custom Splash
 10" A Custom Splash
 12" Z3 Splash
 12" A Zildjian Special Recording Hi-hat Bottom
 18" A Custom Projection Crash
 19" Z3 Rock Crash
 19" Z3 Thrash Ride
 20" A Custom China
 20" FX Oriental China "Trash"Drumheads - Remo
Bass Drums - Powerstroke 3 Clear (batter) | Ebony Powerstroke 3 (reso)
Toms - Emperor Clear (batter) | Ambassador Clear (reso)
Snare - Controlled Sound Reverse Dot (main, batter) / Black Suede Emperor (side, batter) | Ambassador Snare Side (reso)Hardware – Yamaha, DW
Yamaha FP9500 Direct Drive Single Pedal (x2)
DW 9000 Pedal (x2)Drumsticks – Zildjian
Zildjian 3A Wood Tip
Zildjian Chihiro Kamijo Artist Series DrumsticksGuitar''' – Gibson
Gibson Les Paul Standard (Blue)

Discography

Studio albums

Mini albums

Singles

Compilation albums

Covers

Demos

Home videos

Awards and nominations
MTV Video Music Awards Japan

See also
 Japanese rock

References

External links
 Official website
 Official blog

Japanese hardcore punk groups
Japanese alternative rock groups
Japanese heavy metal musical groups
Musical groups established in 2004
Musical groups from Kanagawa Prefecture
NBCUniversal Entertainment Japan artists